Carlos Barbero Cuesta (born 29 April 1991 in Burgos) is a Spanish former cyclist, who competed as a professional from 2012 to 2022. He rode in the 2015 Vuelta a España.

Major results
Source: 

2013
 1st Stage 2 Ronde de l'Isard
 1st  Young rider classification, Vuelta a Burgos
 5th Overall Vuelta a Castilla y León
 6th Road race, Mediterranean Games
 9th Overall Volta ao Alentejo
2014
 1st  Overall Volta ao Alentejo
1st  Points classification
 1st Circuito de Getxo
 3rd Road race, National Road Championships
 3rd Vuelta a La Rioja
 10th Overall Tour du Loir-et-Cher
 10th Overall Ronde de l'Oise
2015
 1st Philadelphia International Championship
 Tour de Beauce
1st Stages 1 & 4
 1st Stage 2 Vuelta a la Comunidad de Madrid
 1st Stage 1 Vuelta a Burgos
 2nd Road race, National Road Championships
 3rd Klasika Primavera
 3rd Circuito de Getxo
 4th Vuelta a La Rioja
2016
 2nd Vuelta a La Rioja
 3rd Coppa Sabatini
 4th Coppa Bernocchi
 6th Grand Prix d'Ouverture La Marseillaise
 6th Klasika Primavera
 8th Tour de Vendée
2017
 1st  Overall Volta ao Alentejo
1st  Points classification
 1st Circuito de Getxo
 1st Stage 3 Vuelta a Castilla y León
 1st Stage 4 Vuelta a Burgos
 4th Clásica de Almería
 5th Road race, National Road Championships
 8th Vuelta a La Rioja
 10th Overall Vuelta a la Comunidad de Madrid
1st Stage 2
2018
 Vuelta a la Comunidad de Madrid
1st  Points classification
1st Stage 3
 1st Stage 4 Vuelta a Burgos
 2nd Overall Vuelta a Castilla y León
1st  Points classification
1st Stage 1
 2nd Gran Premio Bruno Beghelli
 2nd Circuito de Getxo
 5th Road race, National Road Championships
 5th Trofeo Palma
 8th Clásica de Almería
2019
 1st Stage 1 Tour of Austria
 3rd Overall Vuelta a la Comunidad de Madrid
 4th Clásica de Almería
 8th Klasika Primavera
 9th Overall Vuelta a Castilla y León
 10th Kuurne–Brussels–Kuurne
2020
 6th Overall Saudi Tour
 6th Memorial Marco Pantani
 10th Coppa Sabatini

Grand Tour general classification results timeline

References

External links

1991 births
Living people
Spanish male cyclists
European Games competitors for Spain
Cyclists at the 2015 European Games
Sportspeople from Burgos
Competitors at the 2013 Mediterranean Games
Mediterranean Games competitors for Spain
Cyclists from Castile and León
21st-century Spanish people